Savile Finch (baptised 22 September 1736  – 20 September 1788) was an English politician who sat in the House of Commons from 1757 to 1780.

Finch was the only son of the Honourable John Finch, younger son of Heneage Finch, 1st Earl of Aylesford. His mother was Mary, daughter and heiress of John Savile, of Methley-hall, Yorkshire. He was baptised in Aylesford.

Finch sat as a Member of Parliament for Maidstone from 1757 to 1761 and for Malton from 1761 to 1780.

Finch married Judith Fullerton, daughter of John Fullerton. They had no children and Finch bequeathed the estates to his wife. After his death, she lived at Thrybergh for twenty years and when she died in 1803 left the estate to the Fullerton family.

References

1730s births
1788 deaths
Year of birth uncertain
British MPs 1754–1761
British MPs 1761–1768
British MPs 1768–1774
British MPs 1774–1780
Members of the Parliament of Great Britain for English constituencies
Savile Finch
People from Aylesford